Aldwark (Old English "the old fortification") is a small upland village and parish in the Derbyshire Dales district of Derbyshire, England, about  WSW of Matlock by road or  as the crow flies. Close by are a number of Neolithic burial sites, the most notable being tree-crowned Minninglow, visible for many miles around.

The village is just within the boundaries of the Peak District National Park. The 2001 census recorded a population of just 39 for the parish; over 100 years ago, the township's inhabitants numbered 40. At the 2011 Census the population had increased to 180. In the 18th century Aldwark was probably busier, being a stopping point on the stagecoach route from Buxton to Derby.

There are three listed buildings in the village – Green Farmhouse, Ivy Cottage and Lidgate Farmhouse – all designated at Grade II.

See also
Listed buildings in Aldwark, Derbyshire

References

External links

Villages in Derbyshire
Towns and villages of the Peak District
Derbyshire Dales